Si Tsong, Si Tsang is a Philippine television silent situational comedy series broadcast by GMA Network. Starring Earl Ignacio and Susan Lozada, it premiered on April 3, 1997. The series concluded in 1998.

Premise
Tsong, a professional job applicant, witnessed a crime on his way home. The villains see him, he runs away, crosses the street, dodges bullets, hurdles fences, take a deep breath, jumps into the river and realizes that he can't swim.

Miraculously, a mannequin floats by and 'rescues' him, and in gratitude Tsong brings the mannequin home. Until it is struck by lightning and so is born the naive Tsang.

References

1997 Philippine television series debuts
1998 Philippine television series endings
Filipino-language television shows
GMA Network original programming
Philippine comedy television series